XHPSJL-FM is a radio station on 96.1 FM in San Juan de los Lagos, Jalisco. It is owned by Grupo Radiofónico ZER and known as San Juan FM with a Regional Mexican format.

History
XHPSJL was awarded in the IFT-4 radio auction of 2017. The initial winning bidder, Tecnoradio, paid 12.5 million pesos for the frequency, but was later disqualified nationwide. Zermeño, the third-place bidder, had signed up to be eligible to win stations if other bidders were disqualified and came away with the San Juan de los Lagos station for 3.1 million pesos. The station came to air in April 2019 as the second commercial radio station for San Juan de los Lagos.

References

Radio stations in Jalisco
Radio stations established in 2019
2019 establishments in Mexico